Hot Wheels is a racing video game developed by A. Eddy Goldfarb & Associates, and published by Epyx for the Commodore 64. The game was unveiled in June 1984, at Chicago's Summer Consumer Electronics Show, and was released later that year. Hot Wheels is the first video game to be based on the Hot Wheels toyline, and was marketed by Epyx as part of their Computer Activity Toys series, consisting of video games based on popular toylines.

Gameplay
Hot Wheels begins with the player choosing a vehicle. The player can choose from one of several Hot Wheels vehicles, or can choose to create a custom vehicle instead. Custom vehicles are created by the player in a factory, where the player chooses the design of the vehicle's front, middle, and rear sections.

Once a vehicle has been selected, the player can drive around a side-scrolling city filled with various minigames and activities, including a demolition derby, where the player goes up against three computer-controlled opponents; an expressway, where the player can watch the chosen vehicle drive itself; Bob's Gas, where the player controls a mechanic and must refuel the vehicle and check its tires; a car wash, where the vehicle can be cleaned after becoming dirty from driving; a parking lot, where the player can park the vehicle; and Super Tuner, where the player can have the vehicle's engine checked. Another minigame allows the player to take control of a firetruck, with the objective being to extinguish a fire.

Reception
Robert J. Sodaro of The Guide to Computer Living praised the game for its diversity and its "fun" feature of painting vehicles, and wrote: "The detail accomplished in the graphics of this game are some of the best I've ever seen". Roy Wagner of Computer Gaming World wrote that Hot Wheels "isn't so hot", writing that it was "geared for the younger crowd of about seven". AllGame gave Hot Wheels three stars out of five.

Computer Gamer wrote: "On the whole this is a great game for younger kids, anybody over about 11 would find it very tiring and repetitive after only a few plays. And as there is no score as such to compare against every time you play, there is no on-going challenge. The game is obviously designed for younger players and as such is excellent at what it does. [...] Good presentation, good sound and graphics, good for kids but nobody else".

Zzap!64 gave the game a 40 percent overall rating and called it "a game for the very young  or those wishing to reminisce about the 'good old days'". Zzap!64 called the graphics "bright and jovial but not very well drawn", and praised the "Reasonable tunes", but criticized the game for a lack of interesting and long-lasting gameplay: "Quite jolly for an hour or so. But after that there's little to do".

Ken McMahon of Commodore User gave the game a rating of 5 out of 10 and praised the ability to build a custom vehicle, calling it "quite good fun". However, McMahon wrote: "Getting the car on the road was the only part I really enjoyed. After that things got a bit mundane. Basically it's just a case of driving round town playing at being grown-ups". McMahon called the game "a good buy if you're looking for something for children who want to drive around town just like mum and dad".

References

External links

Hot Wheels at Gamebase 64

1984 video games
Commodore 64 games
Commodore 64-only games
Epyx games
Hot Wheels video games
Racing video games
Video games developed in the United States
Single-player video games